Pierre Joffroy (born 1929 in Hayange, France) is a French author, dramaturge and journalist who wrote for Paris Match, Libération and L'Express. At present he lives in Paris.

In France Joffroy released numerous novels, stage plays and articles.

For a period of 30 years he worked on a biography of Kurt Gerstein before he finally released the book A Spy for God, which deals with Kurt Gerstein's story and the decades of the author's research.

Within the framework of an interview with Deutschlandfunk(DLF) the French author declared, that he considered Kurt Gerstein to be "one of the most important persons of World War II".

Bibliography 
Un séjour à Alcatraz, novel 1965
Les Prétendants, novella 1966 
1416 ou Punition, stage play 1971
Parfait Amour,  novel 1986.
A Spy for God, 2002

Publications
Pierre Joffroy, Le retour des bourreaux in : Paris Match, Nr. 831, Paris, 13 March 1965, S. 3–5, 7, 9. (deals with the process of Munich, 1965)

External links 
Kurt Gertstein
The Binocular-Glasses of La Jetée
Official website

1929 births
Living people
20th-century French novelists
21st-century French novelists
Dramaturges
French biographers
20th-century French dramatists and playwrights
French journalists
French male novelists
20th-century biographers
20th-century French male writers
21st-century French male writers
French male non-fiction writers
Male biographers